Keratin 16 is a protein that in humans is encoded by the KRT16 gene.

Keratin 16 is a type I cytokeratin. It is paired with keratin 6 in a number of epithelial tissues, including nail bed, esophagus, tongue, and hair follicles. Mutations in the gene encoding this protein are associated with the genetic skin disorders including pachyonychia congenita, non-epidermolytic palmoplantar keratoderma and unilateral palmoplantar verrucous nevus.

References

External links
  GeneReviews/NCBI/NIH/UW entry on Pachyonychia Congenita

Further reading

Keratins